Travis McNeal is a former professional American football player who played tight end for five seasons for the Seattle Seahawks and Los Angeles Rams.

References 

1967 births
American football tight ends
Los Angeles Rams players
Seattle Seahawks players
Chattanooga Mocs football players
Living people